The Scillonian Cross is a county flag created in 2002 for the Isles of Scilly, United Kingdom. The flag was designed by the Scilly News, and received positive support from its readers in a popular vote, leading to it being officially registered with the Flag Institute as the official flag for the islands.

The flag's design consists of a white cross over an orange and blue background, with five white stars in the upper-right canton. Each part of the design represents a significant element for Isles of Scilly: the upper orange colour represents the orange-hued sunsets the islands are known for; the lower blue colour represents the surrounding sea around the isles; while the stars represent the isles' locations.

References

Flags of Cornwall
Politics of Cornwall
Cornish nationalism
Isles of Scilly
Piran
Flags with crosses
Isles of Scilly
Flags introduced in 2002